Anna Olkhovyk (born June 18, 1987) is a Ukrainian basketball player for BC TIM-SKUF Kyiv and the Ukrainian national team.  She was born in Kiev, Ukraine.

She participated at the EuroBasket Women 2017.

References

1987 births
Living people
Ukrainian women's basketball players
Basketball players from Kyiv
Small forwards